"What's Come Over My Baby" is a song co-written and recorded by American country music artist Dottie West.  It was released in October 1966 as the third single from the album Suffer Time.  The song reached number 17 on the Billboard Hot Country Singles chart.  West wrote the song with her then-husband Bill.

Chart performance

References

1967 singles
Dottie West songs
Song recordings produced by Chet Atkins
RCA Victor singles
1967 songs
Songs written by Dottie West